Fennagh, Fenagh or Feenagh may refer to:

Places
 Feenagh, County Clare, a civil parish in County Clare, Ireland
 Feenagh, County Limerick, Ireland
 Fenagh, County Leitrim, a civil parish in County Leitrim, Ireland
 Fennagh, County Carlow, Ireland
 Fenagh (crater), a crater on Mars

Other uses
 Book of Fenagh, a manuscript of prose and poetry written in Classical Irish at Fenagh, County Leitrim